WolfQuest is a 3D wildlife simulation video game originally developed by the Minnesota Zoo and game developer company Eduweb, and developed solely by Eduweb since 2013. The game's main purpose is to help players understand wolves and the roles they play in nature by being virtually incarnated as a gray wolf themselves. WolfQuest challenges players to learn about wolf ecology by living the life of a wild wolf in Yellowstone National Park.

In September 2006, The National Science Foundation awarded the Minnesota Zoo and Eduweb a US$508,253 informal education grant to develop WolfQuest. The game was funded by numerous other foundations and donors (including Best Buy) and then distributed as a free download for Mac and Windows computers. In November 2015, Eduweb released a WolfQuest 2.7, an improved and expanded version of the game for purchase. In 2018, Eduweb began development of a new version, WolfQuest: Anniversary Edition, a complete remake and expansion of the game.

History
The first playable demo of WolfQuest was released on October 31, 2007. The first episode of the game was released December 21, 2007, as a free, downloadable game for Macintosh and Windows computers. Amethyst Mountain Deluxe, an expansion of the original Amethyst Mountain map, was released April 23, 2008. A second episode of the game, titled Slough Creek: Survival of the Pack was further released on January 1, 2010. The WolfQuest series has received many revamps, updates, and patches over the course of its development, one of its most notable being the 2.7.2 update on July 4, 2016, featuring graphical improvements to the 3D environment, and many new animals, such as cougars, foxes, and ravens. On November 17, 2015, Wolfquest 2.7, a greatly improved and expanded version of the game, was released. On September 2, 2016, Eduweb released the game for iOS devices, with releases for Android and Kindle devices coming later in the month. The most recent version of the game, WolfQuest: Anniversary Edition, was released for early access on PC/Mac on July 25, 2019. It is a complete remake of the original game, with improved graphics, more animals, and an expanded map. Since then, Eduweb has added the Lost River map from WolfQuest 2.7, multiplayer modes, the Slough Creek episode, and a new, reimagined Lost River DLC map.

Gameplay
Gameplay is divided into two parts – single player, where players are able to play in a "story mode" type adventure, and multiplayer, where players are able to play in real-time with up to eight other people in a player-created game server.

Single-player

WolfQuest was initially developed episodically, and these episodes now form the main single-player game arc:

Amethyst Mountain
In single player, the player must survive as a dispersal gray wolf in Yellowstone National Park. To do so they must hunt elk, moose, and hares, or feed off elk carcasses. They must also avoid dangers such as grizzly bears, cougars, and non-dispersal wolves. However, it is possible to fight off the bears and cougars by chasing them, and fight off other wolves. They have the option to find a mate, which, when successful, will follow and aid the player throughout the rest of the game. In order to find a mate, the player must first earn 800 experience points, mainly by hunting elk, and then search for a mate which can be found in all territories.

When creating their wolf character, players are free to choose the gender, fur coloration, stats, and name of their wolf. There are a variety of coats to choose from, with two sliders that let players change the tints of the guard hairs and undercoat of the wolf. WolfQuest 2.7 added many new customization features, including more coats as well as injuries and a radio collar. Just like real wolves, males are larger in size than females.

Slough Creek
Upon leaving Amethyst Mountain, players (with their mate) enter the Slough Creek map and search for a den to raise pups in a new location, Slough Creek. However, after finding a densite, the player must scent mark the area around the den to make it safe from predators and stranger wolves. After completion, the player will obtain pups. Ravenous bears, coyotes, eagles, cougars, and wolves roam the earth, posing a new threat to young pups as they wait to snatch one up under a novice parent's nose. At the end, you, your mate, and your surviving pups must make a journey for the summer den in the Douglas fir forests. But the player, the player's mate, and pups will run into grizzlies, coyotes, eagles and drowning. The only way pups can get across the river is by finding a shallow sandbar. Wolf territories will also expand, so the player cannot take an easy way out.

Multiplayer
In multiplayer, the objectives of the game are the same with two exceptions. The player co-operates with a maximum of 8 wolves including themselves, and can have no game-sanctioned mate. (Regardless, some players still say that other players are their mates.) Public multiplayer games allow anyone to join. Private games require a game-name and password and allow text and voice chats. (Text chats are filtered through a standard badwords list.) Players are encouraged to report any behavior that breaks the multiplayer rules.

Players in multiplayer can start rallies and hunt bull elk and moose. Bull elk have more meat than cow elk and are many times harder to kill. Moose are far more difficult to hunt than any of the elk, and will take some time to kill, but the reward of meat is greater. Players may bite elk in the neck or back legs while hunting. WolfQuest 2.7 added a multiplayer mode to the Slough Creek mission arc, so players can raise pups together and journey to the rendezvous site.

Lost River
A new map was included with WolfQuest 2.7. Called Lost River, it depicts a fictional valley outside the boundaries of Yellowstone National Park and features both wilderness and urban areas. Humans have abandoned the valley but left clues about some sort of catastrophe. Players are left to speculate what might have happened. This map is available for both single-player and multiplayer games.

Other in-game animals
Prey animals: elk, hare, cattle, moose
Rival animals: grizzly bear, coyote, golden eagle, cougar, red fox, other wolves
Miscellaneous animals: common raven, human, dog

WolfQuest Episode 2 Slough Creek: Survival of the Pack

Episode 2.5 Survival of the Pack: Deluxe
In August 2010, WolfQuest held an "idea contest" via the WolfQuest Community Forum, which can be found here WolfQuest - Index page. The winner for the "Big Idea" section of the contest was Exiah, with her idea "Time and Weather", which affects hunting with weather and time. The winner for the "Game Enhancement" section was Cama, with his idea "I need a rest!", where players can make their wolves sit or lie down to regain stamina faster than they would standing still.

Survival of the Pack: Deluxe was released on October 5, 2011, with several new features added to it, as well as "I need a rest", weather and time was also added. It includes both episodes: Amethyst Mountain and Slough Creek.
Players can press "R" to sit, and pressing it again, to cause their wolf to lie down. The "Z" button will cause a dialogue box to appear, asking the player which time of day they would like to sleep until (Dawn, Day, Dusk, and Night). Weather includes snow: rain, lightning and fire, and affects scents seen in scent-view.

Shortly after the Survival of the Pack: Deluxe release, the version, 2.5.1 came out on October 11, 2011, and was a minor bug fix update to WolfQuest 2.5 (which added weather effects, changing times of day, a new phrase chat, improved lexicon chat safeguards, and more). This version fixed bugs with female wolf choice in single-player, seeing other wolves sit and lie down in multi-player, and a few other minor bugs.

Development Hiatus 
Between 2011 and January 2014, there were no plans for further development for several years. WolfQuest originally planned to make an episode 3 and an episode 4, as stated in the site's frequently asked questions page, located at WolfQuest FAQ - WolfQuest. However, on November 28, 2011, the following was announced on the WolfQuest Community Forums:

"We're glad so many people were so excited for the release of episode 2.5 (WolfQuest: Survival of the Pack Deluxe), and we're hoping everyone is enjoying it. But of course, along with a new release always comes the question: what's next?? As you all should be aware, WolfQuest development is determined by funding. While we continue to discuss possible options for expansion of the game and WolfQuest community, we (the WolfQuest Team) are not currently working on any new releases. If that changes, we will be sure to let you all know. Thank you all for playing the game and conversing on these forums; we hope to continue adding new forum content and game updates if more funding becomes available."

WolfQuest Episode 2.7 development
In spring 2014, Eduweb announced that a tablet version of the game was under development, to be released in the near future. Development took more time than anticipated, and platform support was expanded to include Mac and Windows computers. This new version, called *WolfQuest 2.7, released in November 2015 for Mac and Windows and in September 2016 for phones and tablets. This version includes the entire game, plus many enhancements and new features. Following Eduweb's plans to continue with the project's development, the community forums and website will remain online and freely accessible for the foreseeable future, rendering the 2012 announcement null and void as of 2014. It has been stated that with strong sales of version 2.7, a third episode may be a possibility. On December 31, 2016, the game dev announced that they were beginning work on another episode. There is currently no official release date (it was stated to be ''not anytime soon'').

WolfQuest 3: Anniversary Edition development
In August 2017, Eduweb announced that development of  *WolfQuest: Anniversary Edition was underway. This new version, a complete remake and expansion of the original game, serves as the foundation for new chapters such as Tower Fall. Eduweb released the first episode as early access  on July 25, 2019, for PC/Mac.

WolfQuest 3: Anniversary Edition includes: 
 Vast game world stretching from the Lamar River to the summit of Amethyst Mountain. 49 square kilometers to explore!
 Deeper and more engaging gameplay, from tracking animal scents to attacking prey, from fighting stranger wolves to courting prospective mates.
 Sophisticated ecological simulation of animal's daily lives. Persistent elk herds roam the mountain slopes, while wolf packs patrol and defend their territory.
 Realistic graphics of the flora and fauna of Yellowstone's Northern Range — the heart of wolf country in Yellowstone National Park.
 More wolf customizations: more howls, more body variation, and even eye color!
 Dynamic weather and day-night cycle, for greater immersion.

Reception

Reviewers have praised WolfQuest for being a fun and educational way to teach a younger audience about biology and ecology. Randy Salas from the Star Tribune wrote that "Authenticity abounds in WolfQuest," and that "The game seems ideally suited for its target age range." Following updates and new releases, reviewers agree that WolfQuest continues to offer new experiences that emulate encounters in the wild. Christy Matte from Common Sense Media says that "WolfQuest is a compelling simulation that's bound to draw kids into what it is like to be a wolf."

Accolades

Wolf Quest: Anniversary Edition released as Early Access for PC/Mac
Eduweb released the first episode of Wolf Quest: Anniversary Edition (Amethyst Mountain) as early access for PC/Mac on 25 July 2019 on Steam and itch.io. While in Early Access, Eduweb is updating the game frequently with more features, multiplayer, and ultimately the Slough Creek episode with pups.

Also in development, a significant expansion of the game called the WolfQuest Saga, which will continue the life of the pack: time will pass, the pups will grow, learn to hunt, help with the next year's litter of pups, and eventually disperse -- and so on, year after year, until the player-wolf dies.

References

External links
 WolfQuest website
 Minnesota Zoo website
 Eduweb website

2007 video games
Android (operating system) games
IOS games
MacOS games
Role-playing video games
Windows games
Biological simulation video games
Video games about wolves
Video games developed in the United States
Video games set in the United States
Video games set in North America
Multiplayer and single-player video games